Basawan Singh Indoor Stadium is a public indoor stadium. This stadium is also known as Swatantrata Senani Basawan Singh Indoor Stadium.

Location
This stadium is located at Yadav Chowk, Cinema Road, Hajipur.

References

Hajipur
Vaishali district
Sports venues in Bihar
Indoor arenas in India
Year of establishment missing